Natalie Ong (born 19 December 2000), known professionally as NYA, is a Singaporean Australian singer-songwriter who rose to fame after appearing on the eighth season of The X-Factor Australia in 2016. She has been recording and releasing music in China while appearing on shows.

Personal life
Ong was born in Singapore, but moved to Australia when she was 2 and a half years old. Ong was a senior student at Waverley Christian College in Victoria. She also has a younger brother.

Career
Ong rose to fame after appearing in the eighth season of The X-Factor Australia in 2016. Ong auditioned for The X Factor singing "The Voice Within" by Christina Aguilera. Her mentor Adam Lambert selected Ong as one of his top three for the live shows after she sang "I'd Rather Go Blind" by Etta James. She was eliminated in Week 1 but grew success after the show.

Following the success , she produced her own single called "Get Gold" in 2017 & appeared on the musical called Army Daze 2 in 2017 where she played the role of Renee & performed at ChildAid 2016 & 2017 at the Home Team Show & Festival 2017 in celebration of NS50 . Both performance appearance was directed by Dick Lee.

She have recently have moved to China to grow her music career under a new name NYA奈亞. She have since produced Chinese singles.

Discography

References

https://3g.163.com/ent/article/ETD55HIG00039206.html?spss=adap_pc

External links
 
 

2000 births
Living people
Singaporean people of Chinese descent
Australian women singer-songwriters
Australian people of Chinese descent
Singaporean emigrants to Australia
The X Factor (Australian TV series) contestants